Chung Jong-sam (born 8 May 1973) is a South Korean former professional tennis player.

Chung reached career best rankings of 516 in singles and 420 in doubles. He featured in the singles qualifying draw for the 1994 Australian Open and made his only ATP Tour main draw appearance in doubles at the 1996 Korea Open.

References

External links
 
 

1973 births
Living people
South Korean male tennis players
20th-century South Korean people